Aequum was a Roman colony located near modern-day Čitluk, a village near Sinj, Croatia.

Location

The valley of the middle part of the Cetina river and its surrounding area, known as the District of Cetina, represent the backbone of the entire area and separate geographical region of mountainous Dalmatian hinterland. Its  stream flows through dry karst fields covered by sub-Mediterranean vegetation where many archaeological remains are preserved. Modern day Čitluk is situated near the town Sinj at the edge of the Cetina valley.

History and significance 
During the Roman administration in the mid-first century AD, Aequum reached the status of an agrarian Roman colony after it was settled by the veterans of Legio VII Claudia Pia Fidelis during the rule of emperor Claudius (41–45 AD). The colonia was founded by Claudius and named colonia Claudia Aequum; it was the only colony in the interior of the province of Dalmatia.

Aequum was a planned city of  enclosed by walls  with features of classic forms of ancient urbanism (urbs quadrata). The town had an orthogonal grid of streets with numerous public building and city fortifications. Aequum was the center of a wider area where the colonists lived, and it was packed with public services, with very little housing. The city offered colonists from a wider area a place to fulfill their administrative, cultural, religious and social needs and duties. The area is not fully explored. In his 1774 Viaggio in Dalmazia ("Journey to Dalmatia"), Alberto Fortis describes the ruins of canals and an ancient amphitheatre.

Notable persons
Sextus Julius Severus was a member of one of the most notable families in Roman Dalmatia. He served as governor of Moesia and was appointed governor of Britain in 131. According to Cassius Dio, Severus was Hadrian's best general. In 135 AD, he suppressed the Jewish rebellion (Bar Kokhba revolt) in Judaea, the event that marked the beginning of the Jewish diaspora.

References

Further reading
 

Roman towns and cities in Croatia
Populated places established in the 1st century